Sikder Group is a family-owned Bangladeshi business conglomerate. Zainul Haque Sikder founded the group in the early 1950s, and was its chairman at his death in 2021. His sons, Rick Haque Sikder and Ron Haque Sikder, are directors of the Sikder Group.

History 
Sikder Group started as a textile and garment manufacturing company. 

In 2010, the US State of California sued the Group's carwash business to the tune of $6.6 million for allegedly exploiting workers.

PowerPac Holdings, a sister concern of the Sikder group, got a contract to build a powerplant from Power Development Board in August 2011. 

Its subsidiary PowerPac Ports Limited was given the government contract to operate two jetties in the Port of Mongla in 2016. The same year PowerPac got approval from Bangladesh Economic Zones Authority to operate Mongla Economic Zone in Bagerhat. At the end of 2016, the company's liabilities included about 2,000 crore Bangladeshi taka ($253M as of 2016) spread among three banks.

Sikder Group has also attracted attention from various law enforcement agencies around the world for having ties to criminal activities, including kidnapping, extortion, attempted murder and money laundering.

On 19 May 2020, Exim Bank (Bangladesh) filed a case against the Group at Gulshan Police Station for allegedly shooting at and abducting the managing director and associate managing director of the bank. Following this filing, the main accused in the case, Ron Haque Sikder and Dipu Haque Sikder, fled the country in an air ambulance disguised as patients. Later the duo, Ron Sikder and Dipu Sikder, were acquitted in a court verdict. Dhaka Metropolitan Magistrate Rajesh Chowdhury passed the order after complainant of the case Exim Bank Director Lt Col (retd) Serajul Islam told the court that he had no objection if the court accepted a police final report.

Subsidiaries

See also
 List of companies of Bangladesh

References

Conglomerate companies of Bangladesh
Manufacturing companies of Bangladesh